Dyzin  is a village in the administrative district of Gmina Celestynów, within Otwock County, Masovian Voivodeship, in east-central Poland. As of 2014, the village had a population of 257.

References

Dyzin